Bingo is a town in the Bingo Department of Boulkiemdé Province in central western Burkina Faso. It is the capital of the Bingo Department and has a population of 2,111.

Namesakes 
There are several other places in Burkina Faso with this name, such as one southwest of Kaya.

References

External links 
 Satellite map at Maplandia.com

Populated places in Boulkiemdé Province